Raj Kanya is a 1955 Hindi Bollywood film starring Nalini Jaywant, with playback by Mohammed Rafi and Asha Bhosle. Music by Chitragupt and lyrics by G S Nepali.

References

1955 films
1950s Hindi-language films